Sundo may refer to:
Sundo, a Philippine film
Sundo (song), a song by Imago
Sundo (monk) (順道, or Shundao in Chinese), a monk in Goguryeo